Tachosa aspera is a moth of the family Erebidae. It is found in Angola, Ethiopia, Namibia, Nigeria, Rwanda, Tanzania and Uganda.

References

Moths described in 2004
Tachosa
Moths of Africa